The dull-mantled antbird (Sipia laemosticta) is a perching bird species in the antbird family (Thamnophilidae).

Taxonomy
The dull-mantled antbird was described by the English naturalist Osbert Salvin in 1865 and given the binomial name Myrmeciza laemosticta. A molecular phylogenetic study published in 2013 found that the genus Myrmeciza, as then defined, was polyphyletic. In the resulting rearrangement to create monophyletic genera four species, including the dull-mantled antbird were moved to the resurrected genus Sipia that had been introduced by the Austrian ornithologist Carl Eduard Hellmayr in 1924.

The Magdalena antbird (S. palliata) was previously considered conspecific with the dull-mantled antbird but was elevated to species status based on an analysis of vocalisation and mitochondrial DNA sequences published in 2010.

The dull-mantled antbird is part of a group of species whose heads are uniformly grey, typically dark or even blackish, in males and females, only the throat being black – sometimes spotted white –, pale or (very rarely) brownish in some taxa. Without doubt, its closest living relative is the Esmeraldas antbird ("S." nigricauda), a sister species occurring to the southwest of the dull-mantled antbird's range. The stub-tailed antbird ("S." berlepschi) is a hypermelanic species whose close relationship to the preceding two is still quite obvious; the chestnut-backed antbird (Poliocrania exsul) and grey-headed antbird ("M." griseiceps) are somewhat more distantly related and uniquely apomorphic; still, they also have an almost completely grey head in both sexes.

Description
Overall, these birds look essentially blackish grey in the front half and dark reddish brown in the hind part, with a black wing-patch with white spots right where the two main colors meet. But in the dusky forest understory, the birds may appear all-black, with only the white spotting standing out.

The plumage of the male is blackish grey on the head, neck, upper mantle and on the underside up to the upper belly, and reddish brown on most of the remaining upperparts and underparts; remiges and rectrices are somewhat darker, with dark reddish brown edges. The throat is black, extending onto the breast as irregular black spotting. The primary coverts are tipped cinnamon and the secondary and tertiary coverts are black with white tips on the upperwing; the underwing coverts are all grey. As in many antbirds, there is a white patch between the shoulders; it has some black specks around it. The iris is red, the bill black, and the feet are lead-grey.

The female is similar but slightly lighter overall; its black throat color has many white spots and does not extend onto the breast. Its secondary coverts and sometimes the crown are tinged cinnamon.

The loudsong of the male consists of a rapid series of short but individually distinct notes, 8 per 1.8 seconds, the first three being slightly upslurred or flat, while the latter five are downslurred. Possibly, there is some geographic variation in the song, indication that the two subspecies might indeed be valid: the songs of the southern population apparently transitions smoothly between the two parts, while in northern birds, it seems that the first notes are all markedly upslurred, abruptly changing to the downslurred notes. The female loudsong resembles that of the male initially, being just raspier; the second part however consists of 2-4 short notes that successively become deeper and more muted. In mated couples, the male often sings first, followed immediately by the female.

The dull-mantled antbird also gives very short (0.1 to 0.2 seconds) downslurred burr as well as abrupt chip or chip-chip calls.

Ecology
Its natural habitat is tropical moist lowland forests, usually between 300–750 m ASL, but occasionally almost at sea level and sometimes up to 1,500 m ASL. It occurs in the understory and forest floor, and particularly frequents deep damp ravines in the foothills, in slopes next to streams, and in other areas that have a densely vegetated herbaceous understory.

The diet of the dull-mantled antbird is composed of insects and other arthropods; recorded prey items are spiders (Araneae), cockroaches (Blattaria), beetles (Coleoptera), crickets (Gryllidae), woodlice (Oniscidea) and indeterminate insect larvae. It feeds as an individual, as a pair or in small family groups, moving close to the ground – usually not more than 10 cm above the forest floor –, every now and then jumping up to a low branch to take a look around and immediately descending again. Its prey is usually caught by gleaning, pecked up from between the leaf litter or, after a jump up or a short flutter, from vegetation. It rarely rummages through the leaf litter to search for prey; rather, it will observe its surroundings tensely, beating down its tail forcefully and slowly raising it up again, and then strike directly at something that has attracted its interest. Small prey is devoured immediately; larger animals are beaten vigorously on branches to make them easier to swallow. The species will occasionally follow army ants but it is not an obligate ant-follower like some other true antbirds or ground antbirds (Formicariidae); while it may join mixed-species feeding flocks on occasion, it usually prefers to forage on its own or with its family.

Little is known about its breeding behaviour. The only described nest, found in Colombia in March, was a simple flimsy cup placed low in a pepper plant (Piper sp.) growing on a steep gorge. The two eggs were white with cinnamon spots at the blunt end. Hardly anything is known about the breeding habits of its relatives either; two-egg clutches seem to be the norm however, and the available evidence points towards a prolonged breeding season starting early in the year and lasting perhaps to June in northern South America, and maybe starting in spring and lasting to September or so further north.

Footnotes

References
 Cuervo, Andrés M.; Hernández-Jaramillo, Alejandro; Cortés-Herrera, José Oswaldo & Laverde, Oscar (2007): Nuevos registros de aves en la parte alta de la Serranía de las Quinchas, Magdalena medio, Colombia [New bird records from the highlands of Serranía de las Quinchas, middle Magdalena valley, Colombia]. Ornitología Colombiana 5: 94-98 [Spanish with English abstract]. PDF fulltext
 Irestedt, Martin; Fjeldså, Jon; Nylander, Johan A.A. & Ericson, Per G.P. (2004): Phylogenetic relationships of typical antbirds (Thamnophilidae) and test of incongruence based on Bayes factors. BMC Evol. Biol. 4: 23.  Supplementary information
 Zimmer, Kevin J. & Isler, Morton L. (2003a): 178. Dull-mantled Antbird. In: del Hoyo, Josep; Elliott, Andrew & Christie, David A. (eds.): Handbook of Birds of the World (Vol. 8: Broadbills to Tapaculos): 659–660, plate 65. Lynx Edicions, Barcelona. 
 Zimmer, Kevin J. & Isler, Morton L. (2003b): Family Thamnophilidae (Typical Antbirds). In: del Hoyo, Josep; Elliott, Andrew & Christie, David A. (eds.): Handbook of Birds of the World (Vol. 8: Broadbills to Tapaculos): 448–681, plates 39–69. Lynx Edicions, Barcelona. 

dull-mantled antbird
dull-mantled antbird
Birds of Costa Rica
Birds of Panama
Birds of Colombia
dull-mantled antbird
dull-mantled antbird
Taxonomy articles created by Polbot